Gerardo Eugenio Martínez Dibene (born 14 November 1979 in La Paz, Baja California Sur) is a Mexican high jumper. His personal best jump is 2.30 metres, achieved in April 2007 in Walnut. This is the current Mexican record.

Martínez won the gold medal at the 2002 Central American and Caribbean Games and the bronze medal at the 2006 Central American and Caribbean Games. He finished fifth at the 2005 Summer Universiade and at the 2007 Pan American Games. He also competed at the 2007 World Championships without reaching the final.

Competition record

References

External links

1979 births
Living people
Mexican male high jumpers
Olympic athletes of Mexico
Sportspeople from Baja California Sur
Athletes (track and field) at the 2008 Summer Olympics
Central American and Caribbean Games gold medalists for Mexico
Central American and Caribbean Games bronze medalists for Mexico
Competitors at the 2002 Central American and Caribbean Games
Competitors at the 2006 Central American and Caribbean Games
Athletes (track and field) at the 2007 Pan American Games
Pan American Games competitors for Mexico
World Athletics Championships athletes for Mexico
Central American and Caribbean Games medalists in athletics
Competitors at the 2005 Summer Universiade
People from La Paz, Baja California Sur
21st-century Mexican people
20th-century Mexican people